The Kolonialpfadfinder ("Colonial Scouts" in German) were three Scout unions between 1926 and 1933, which were connected by a common history. The aim of their work was the recovery of the German colonies lost after World War I and the training of emigrants. In the middle of 1933 the membership was about 5,000 Scouts.

External links 

http://www.freiburg-postkolonial.de/Seiten/FreiburgerZeitung1932-06-01.htm
Scouting and Guiding in Germany